Elati (meaning "pine tree") is a mountain on the Greek island of Lefkada. It is the island's highest peak.

Settlements
Settlements at or near the mountain are: 
Agios Petros, southwest
Karya, northwest

See also
List of mountains in Greece

References

Mountains of Greece
Lefkada
Landforms of Lefkada (regional unit)
Mountains of the Ionian Islands (region)